Chinna Ponnusamy Padayatchi was an Indian stage actor, playwright, dancer and teacher of theatrical arts. Notable among his students was Shivaji Ganesan.

Early life
Padayatchi was born in Chidambaram in Tamil Nadu.

Acclaim
Shivaji Ganesan, one of his notable students in theatrical arts said "My teacher (Chinna Ponniswamy Padayachi of Chidambaram) taught me Bharatnatyam, acting, body movements... Practically everything. Padayachi, was himself an outstanding stage actor. And he learnt in an atmosphere that was reminiscent of an ashram school."

References

Indian male dramatists and playwrights
Tamil dramatists and playwrights
20th-century Indian dramatists and playwrights
Dramatists and playwrights from Tamil Nadu
20th-century Indian male writers